Marcus Edward Leaver (born 1 April 1970) is a British businessman who was Chief Executive of Chrysalis Books Group from 2003 to 2005, President of Sterling Publishing from 2008 to 2012, and CEO of Quarto Group from 2012 to 2018. In 2019, together with Mark Smith, Leaver established the Welbeck Publishing Group.

The son of former Premier League Chief Executive Peter Leaver, he was educated at Eton College, the University of East Anglia (BA History of Art & Architecture, 1992) and London Business School (MBA, 1999).

References

1970 births
Living people
People educated at Eton College
Alumni of the University of East Anglia
Alumni of London Business School